Kacper Klich (born 12 November 1994) is a Polish swimmer. He competed in the men's 4 × 200 metre freestyle relay event at the 2016 Summer Olympics.

References

External links
 

1994 births
Living people
Olympic swimmers of Poland
Swimmers at the 2016 Summer Olympics
Sportspeople from Chorzów
Polish male freestyle swimmers
21st-century Polish people